No Strings Attached may refer to:

 No Strings Attached (film), a 2011 romantic comedy film
 No Strings Attached (Meat Puppets album), 1990 compilation CD
 No Strings Attached (Those Darn Accordions album), 1996
 No Strings Attached (NSYNC album), 2000
 No Strings Attached Tour
 No Strings Attached (Jassi Sidhu album), 2005
 No Strings Attached (Dom & Roland album), 2009
 No Strings Attached (novel), the 170th volume in the Nancy Drew Mystery Series
 No Strings Attached, a 2006 comedy tour by comedian Carlos Mencia
 No Strings Attached, the working title for the British television series That Puppet Game Show
 "No Strings Attached", the working title for "Krytie TV", an episode of the British television series Red Dwarf

See also
 Casual dating